James Gregg may refer to:

 James M. Gregg (1806–1869), U.S. Representative from Indiana
 James Gregg (priest) (1820–1905), Dean of Limerick